Terrorism and mass attacks in Canada includes acts of terrorism, as well as mass shootings, vehicle-ramming attacks, mass stabbings, and other such acts committed in Canada that people may associate with terroristic tactics but have not been classified as terrorism by the Canadian legal system. (For example, the 2018 Toronto shooting was a mass shooting that law enforcement officials did not connect to terrorism.)

The Criminal Code of Canada defines terrorist activity to include an "act or omission undertaken, in or outside Canada, for a political, religious or ideological purpose, that is intended to intimidate the public with regard to its security, including its economic security, or to compel a person, government or organization (whether in or outside Canada) to do or refrain from doing any act, and that intentionally causes one of a number of specific forms of serious harm." As such, some of the terrorist acts listed here are related to external events and nationalities, while others, such as the FLQ crisis in 1970, are related to internal tensions within the country.

Matters relevant to overall counterterrorism in Canada, as well as national security within the federal government, fall under the jurisdiction of the Minister of Public Safety and Emergency Preparedness, who heads Public Safety Canada (PSC). Two other ministers with particularly crucial roles with respect to counter-terrorism are the Ministers of Foreign Affairs and of National Defence.

The Canadian government uses the National Terrorism Threat Level (NTTL) to identify the probability of terrorism occurring in Canada. , Canada's current threat level is "Medium," which means that a "violent act of terrorism could occur;" it has been at this level since October 2014.

Overview of legal framework and response
Overall issues of national security fall under the jurisdiction of the Minister of Public Safety and Emergency Preparedness, who heads Public Safety Canada (PSC). While provincial/territorial governments are responsible for general law enforcement and criminal prosecutions, the Royal Canadian Mounted Police (part of the PSC portfolio) is given primary responsibility, under the Security Offences Act (SOA), for the investigation of offences involving national security.

Canadian federal statutes establish a legal regime that prosecutes terrorists for their activities. The Public Prosecution Service of Canada (PPSC), under the Attorney General of Canada, prosecutes offenses on behalf of the Canadian government, including those involving national security such as terrorist activities. If a person carries out a terrorist attack or instructs someone else to carry out a terrorist attack, they are given a life sentence. Anyone who facilitates a terrorist attack is liable to imprisonment for no more than 10 years.

The Criminal Code of Canada defines terrorist activity to include an "act or omission undertaken, in or outside Canada, for a political, religious or ideological purpose, that is intended to intimidate the public with regard to its security, including its economic security, or to compel a person, government or organization (whether in or outside Canada) to do or refrain from doing any act, and that intentionally causes one of a number of specific forms of serious harm."

The Combating Terrorism Act, which came into force in July 2013, renewed parts of the Criminal Code by creating four new offences intended to prevent and deter individuals from leaving Canada for particular terrorism-related purposes.

Canada's Anti-Terrorism Act (ATA) "provides measures for the Government of Canada to create a list of entities that: have knowingly carried out, attempted to carry out, participated in or facilitated a terrorist activity" or "knowingly acted on behalf of, at the direction of or in association with an entity that has knowingly carried out, attempted to carry out, participated in or facilitated a terrorist activity." The Act specifically provides that "for the Governor in Council to establish by regulation a list on which, on the recommendation of the Minister of Public Safety, any entity may be placed." The ATA replaced the Official Secrets Act with the Security of Information Act (SOIA), which focuses on "conduct harmful to, or likely to harm Canada." It also defined the concept of "harm to Canadian interests" to address a broad range of potential harms, including terrorist activity, interference with critical infrastructure, and the development of weapons of mass destruction in contravention of international law.

Terrorist financing, on the other hand, is addressed through the Proceeds of Crime (Money Laundering) and Terrorist Financing Act, as well as the Income Tax Act and the Charities Registration (Security Information) Act. In terms of the cross-border movement of potential threats, assessing the admissibility of those applying for temporary or permanent residence, or refugee status is facilitated under the Immigration and Refugee Protection Act (IRPA).

The Department of Foreign Affairs and International Trade Act provides the Minister of Foreign Affairs with responsibility over all matters relating to the conduct of Canada's external affairs, including countering international terrorism and responding to terrorist incidents abroad. Moreover, the Government of Canada lists state supporters of terrorism under the State Immunity Act, which (like the JVTA) revokes certain legal immunities from listed countries, allowing civil suits to be filed against those countries in Canadian courts for loss or damage resulting from its involvement in terrorism anywhere in the world. In 2012, both Syria and Iran were listed.

In terms of emergency response, leadership of the Public Safety Minister is granted by the Emergency Management Act.

Redress 
The Justice for Victims of Terrorism Act (JVTA) allows Canada's victims of terrorism to sue perpetrators of terrorism and those that support them for loss or damage that occurred as a result of an act of terrorism committed in Canada or abroad. Similar to the JVTA, amendments made to the State Immunity Act, allow for countries listed by the federal government as state supporters of terrorism to be sued in Canadian courts for loss or damage resulting from its involvement in terrorism anywhere in the world.

On 1 May 2006, the Government of Canada announced the launch of a full public inquiry into the Air India Flight 182 bombing and its investigation. Initiated later in June, the inquiry was to look into the ways in which Canadian law restricted funding terrorist groups, how well witness protection is provided in terrorist cases, if Canada needs to upgrade its airport security, and if issues of co-operation between the RCMP, CSIS, and other law enforcement agencies had been resolved. It was to also provide a forum wherein families of the victims could testify on the impact of the bombing and would not repeat any criminal trials.

From 1 December 2011 to 31 July 2012, families of the passengers and crew who died on Air India Flight 182 on 23 June 1985 have been offered a one-time ex gratia payment by Canadian government, as "a demonstration of solicitude and recognition for the administrative disdain families experienced in the years following" the tragedy. Payments have been made to eligible applicants for 275 victims. Moreover, every June 23, some Canadians observe National Day of Remembrance for Victims of Terrorism to honour the victims.

Emergency response 
In terms of emergency response, leadership of the Minister of Public Safety is granted by the Emergency Management Act. The chief means through which the Public Safety Minister facilitates their emergency response is through the Government Operations Centre (GOC). The GOC, on behalf of the federal government, supports response coordination across the government and others.

In practice, the immediate response to terrorist incidents in Canada is to be led by local law enforcement and emergency management authorities. This involves the RCMP as being the first police responder in those provinces and territories where it provides local police services. Particular terrorist incidents may involve specific responses from designated agencies; for instance, under the National Defence Act or through the Crown Prerogative, the Canadian Armed Forces can be called upon to respond directly to terrorist incidents in Canada. As such, the Minister of National Defence plays a key role in preparation for, and execution of, any deployment of Canadian Forces in response to terrorist activity domestically or abroad.

Immediately following the 2001 September 11 attacks in the United States, the Royal Canadian Mounted Police initiated Project Shock which sought to quickly collect and act on any information or intel related to possible threats posed by Muslims in Canada. Project Thread was a police operation in 2003 that resulted in the arrest of 24 immigrants in the Greater Toronto Area amidst allegations that they formed a threat to national security, and maintained "suspected ties to al-Qaeda."

Counter-terrorism in Canada 
Matters relevant to overall counter-terrorism in Canada, as well as national security within the federal government, fall under the jurisdiction of the Minister of Public Safety and Emergency Preparedness, who heads Public Safety Canada (PSC). Two other ministers with particularly crucial roles with respect to counter-terrorism are the Ministers of Foreign Affairs and of National Defence. Additionally, the National Security Advisor (NSA) is responsible for providing information, advice, and recommendations on security and intelligence to the Prime Minister; co-ordinating the security and intelligence community; and overseeing intelligence assessment.

Claiming that the safety and security of Canadians to be its first priority, the Government of Canada puts significant attention towards its counterterrorism efforts. "Building Resilience Against Terrorism" (2013) is Canada's first counterterrorism strategy, which aims to counter domestic and international terrorism so to protect Canada, Canadians, and Canadian interests. The strategy "assesses the nature and scale of the threat, and "sets out basic principles and elements that underpin the Government's counter-terrorism activities."

The Canadian government uses the National Terrorism Threat Level (NTTL) to identify the probability of terrorism occurring in Canada. , Canada's current threat level is "Medium," which means that a "violent act of terrorism could occur;" it has been at this level since October 2014. More specifically, this means that "extremist groups and individuals located in Canada and abroad, have both the intent AND capability to carry out an act of terrorism in Canada."

Counter-terrorism organizations and jurisdictions 
Federal government organizations that have a hand in counterterrorism in Canada include:

 Canadian Security Intelligence Service (part of Public Safety Canada)
 CSIS Global Operations Centre (CGOC)
 Integrated Terrorism Assessment Centre (ITAC)
 Department of National Defence/Canadian Armed Forces
 Canada Command — provides coordination with other federal departments and agencies, as well as domestic and international partners, in responding to national security events.
 Communications Security Establishment
 Canadian Centre for Cyber Security — a national center for "cyber security readiness and response, exclusive of federal government information technology and information management systems"
 Defence Research and Development Canada
Centre for Security Science
Joint Task Force 2 (JTF 2) — a special forces unit of the Canadian Special Operations Forces Command, that exists to "protect the Canadian national interests and combat terrorism and threats to Canadians at home and abroad."
 Royal Canadian Mounted Police (part of Public Safety Canada) — the primary agency responsible for national security law enforcement across Canada. The RCMP also conducts extraterritorial investigations of terrorist activity when committed against a Canadian citizen or by a Canadian citizen abroad. Among other things, the RCMP also operates:
 Counter-terrorism Information Officer initiative — provides first responders with "terrorism awareness training on key indicators of terrorist activities, techniques and practices in order to help detect threats at the earliest stage possible."
 Integrated National Security Enforcement Teams (INSETs)
 National Operations Centre — a secure and integrated 24/7 command and control centre for centralized monitoring and coordination during "critical incidents and major events"
Government Operations Centre (part of Public Safety Canada) — the chief means through which the Minister of Public Safety facilitates their emergency response. On behalf of the federal government, the Centre supports response coordination across the government and others.

In terms of broader counterterrorism intelligence, other federal organizations also collect information in support of their primary responsibilities; this includes:

 Canada Border Services Agency (part of Public Safety Canada)
 Global Affairs Canada
 Financial Transactions and Reports Analysis Centre
 Transport Canada
 Canadian Air Transport Security Authority (CATSA)
 Charities Directorate (Canada Revenue Agency)

Intelligence assessment 
The Canadian Security Intelligence Service, part of Public Safety Canada, is Canada's primary national intelligence agency. Among other things, CSIS compiles the information they collect themselves with information from other sources to provide Parliament with intelligence assessments on terrorist threats. The National Security Advisor (NSA) is responsible for providing information, advice, and recommendations on security and intelligence to the Prime Minister; co-ordinating the security and intelligence community; and overseeing intelligence assessment.

The Integrated Terrorism Assessment Centre (ITAC) is a cooperative initiative, housed at CSIS, to facilitate intelligence information sharing and analysis within the Canadian intelligence community and to first responders, such as law enforcement. Its assessments integrate intelligence from across departments and agencies as well as from external partners. Similarly, the RCMP's Integrated National Security Enforcement Teams (INSETs) bring together federal, provincial, and municipal police and intelligence resources "to collect, share, and analyze information in support of criminal investigations and threat assessments."

The Communications Security Establishment, administered under the Department of National Defence (DND), is responsible for foreign signals intelligence (SIGINT) and protecting government electronic communication networks.

The Privy Council Office's Security and Intelligence Secretariat provides policy support to the NSA, the Prime Minister, and the Clerk of the Privy Council, as well as coordinating committees on security and intelligence issues. The PCO's International Assessment Staff (PCO IAS) helps to coordinate "the efforts of the Canadian assessment community and provides PCO and other senior government clients with policy-neutral assessments of foreign developments and trends that may affect Canadian interests."

Terrorist financing 
Terrorist financing in Canada is addressed through the Proceeds of Crime (Money Laundering) and Terrorist Financing Act (PCMLTFA), as well as the Income Tax Act and the Charities Registration (Security Information) Act, which are administered by the Department of Finance.

In accordance with the PCMLTFA, the Financial Transactions and Reports Analysis Centre works to prevent and deter terrorist financing. Likewise, the Charities Directorate of the Canada Revenue Agency reviews applications, conducts audits, and collects and analyzes multi-source intelligence in order to detect and address risks to Canada's charitable sector. These operations are in accordance with the Income Tax Act, the Charities Registration (Security Information) Act, and the PCMLTFA.

The Finance Department also leads the Canadian effort in related international activities, particularly regarding the work of the Financial Action Task Force (FATF).

Border and transportation security 
Measures taken in regards to cross-border movement of potential threats are facilitated under the Immigration and Refugee Protection Act (IRPA), primarily by the Canada Border Services Agency (CBSA) and Immigration, Refugees and Citizenship Canada (IRCC).

The CBSA, which is a part of Public Safety Canada, has an "Immigration Security Screening" program, which can "detect the movement of potential subjects of interest as they apply for temporary or permanent residence, or refugee status," as per IRPA. CBSA also monitors the cross-border flow of currency, and has the authority to seize "unreported currency flows suspected of being the proceeds of crime or related to terrorist financing."

Under IRPA, the Canadian government uses security certificates to detain and deport foreign nationals and all other non-citizens living in Canada. The certificate can be issued towards a permanent resident or any other non-citizen perceived to be a threat to national security, as well as those suspected of violating human rights or of having membership within organized crime.

The security of transportation systems are primarily facilitated by Transport Canada, which is the lead department for responding to transportation security incidents and for transportation-related emergency preparedness. This includes the security of aviation, marine, rail, road, and intermodal transportation security systems. Transport Canada's responsibilities are granted through several key federal statutes, such as the Aeronautics Act, the Marine Transportation Security Act, the Railway Safety Act, the International Bridges and Tunnels Act and the Transportation of Dangerous Goods Act.

Public Safety Canada and Transport Canada jointly oversee the Canadian no-fly list, called the Passenger Protect program, which identifies individuals who may pose a threat to aviation security and "reduces their ability to cause harm or threaten aviation by taking action, such as preventing them from boarding an aircraft." Additional security is provided through passenger and baggage screening, which is conducted by Transport Canada's Canadian Air Transport Security Authority (CATSA).

International and extraterritorial security 
The Combating Terrorism Act, which came into force in July 2013, was put in place with the intent to prevent and deter individuals from leaving Canada for particular terrorism-related purposes.

The Department of Foreign Affairs and International Trade Act provides the Minister of Foreign Affairs with responsibility over all matters relating to the conduct of Canada's external affairs, including countering international terrorism and responding to terrorist incidents abroad. As such, the Foreign Affairs Minister leads Canada's response to terrorist or security-related incidents outside of the country. Global Affairs Canada is accordingly responsible for assessing social, economic, security, and political developments that "help define a global threat environment." Depending on the nature of the incident, the Canadian response can include the provision of consular assistance to Canadians overseas (including expatriates); financial or physical aid; or deployments of experts from Canada's national security community.

Extraterritorial investigations of terrorist activity are investigated by the Royal Canadian Mounted Police (part of Public Safety Canada) when committed against a Canadian citizen or by a Canadian citizen abroad.

Various federal organizations, particularly the Canada Centre for Community Engagement and Prevention of Violence (Canada Centre; also part of Public Safety Canada), closely collaborate with partners in the Five Eyes (United States, United Kingdom, Australia, New Zealand), the Group of Seven (G7), and the European Union. The Canada Centre also actively participates in multilateral forums such as the United Nations and the Global Counterterrorism Forum (GCTF), as well as collaborating with the Institute for Strategic Dialogue, the Hedayah Center, and the Centre for Research and Evidence on Security Threats (CREST).

The Canadian government also engages in the Global Coalition against Daesh, a partnership of 79 countries that works towards defeating Daesh through such activities as preventing the flow of foreign terrorist fighters across borders and countering the group's communications.

Biosecurity 
In terms of chemical, biological, radiological, and nuclear warfare, the surveillance for diseases and events resulting from the use of CBRNE agents is the responsibility of Public Health Agency of Canada, who is in charge of coordinating a public health response to such a terrorist incident. Monitoring services, hazard assessments, information, and advisories and decontamination strategies are also provided by Health Canada for CBRNE events. PHAC also maintains the National Emergency Stockpile System, which contains medical countermeasures against CBRNE agents and disaster medical supplies for use in mass-casualty incidents.

Moreover, all members of the Canadian Forces are trained in CBRNE defense. The Canadian Joint Incident Response Unit is a unit under the direction of the Canadian Special Operations Forces Command that is tasked with supporting the federal government in preventing, controlling, and mitigating CBRN threats to Canada, Canadians, and Canadian interests.

Health Canada is also mandated to provide services to support the overall security objectives for major international events (such as the 2010 Winter Olympics or G20 summit), specifically in the areas of health and safety of federal government employees, surveillance and response to radiological nuclear threats, and support to first-responders in the event of a CBRNE event or disease outbreak.

Designated organizations 

The government of Canada has banned more than 52 terrorist organizations. These include Al Qaeda, the Armed Islamic Group, Euskadi Ta Askatasuna (ETA), Liberation Tigers of Tamil Eelam (LTTE), the International Sikh Youth Federation, the Palestine Liberation Front, the Popular Front for the Liberation of Palestine, the Popular Front for the Liberation of Palestine-General Command, Hamas, Palestinian Islamic Jihad, Hezbollah, Kahane Chai, the Taliban, and Mujahedin e-Khalq. In 2019, Combat 18 and Blood & Honour were the first neo-Nazi groups in Canada to be banned  by the government.

In April 2006, the Canadian government designated the Liberation Tigers of Tamil Eelam as a terrorist group. In December that year, the government expanded the federal ban of Hezbollah from the purely militant wing to all 16 sub-organizations.

Research on extremism in Canada 
The Kanishka Project was a CA$10-million, five-year initiative of Public Safety Canada that provided funding to research on terrorism-related matters affecting Canada.

Announced by the Government of Canada in June 2011, the Project was named after the Boeing 747-237B (Emperor Kanishka) plane that was bombed in the Air India Flight 182 attack of 1985. It funded nearly 70 projects and contributed to hosting various events related to discussing counter-terrorism. As part of the Project, $3.7 million was invested with Social Sciences and Humanities Research Council (SSHRC) towards supporting research and related activities that addressed the issues identified by the Kanishka Project.

The Canadian Network for Research on Terrorism, Security and Society (TSAS), located at the University of Waterloo, is an academic research network purposed to form "multidisciplinary research on terrorist radicalization" and "the coordinated interaction of academic researchers with government officials." It was created in 2012 with funding both the Kanishka Project and a grant from the SSHRC. TSAS' co-directors are Lorne Dawson and Veronica Kitchen.

Radicalization in Canada 
Radicalization, or having radical thoughts, in Canada is not illegal or necessarily problematic in and of itself. The Constitution of Canada, through the Charter of Rights and Freedoms, protects the freedom of thought, belief, opinion, and expression of Canadians.

In terms of radicalization to violence, various federal and provincial/territorial government initiatives have been established, particularly under Public Safety Canada on the federal level. Particularly, the Canada Centre for Community Engagement and Prevention of Violence (Canada Centre) leads the Canadian government's efforts to "counter radicalization to violence." It does not manage or advise on individual cases, but rather addresses the issue in terms of broad strategy. The Centre was mandated in 2015; the federal budget the following year allocated $35 million over five years to establish and support the Centre, in addition to $10 million per year on-going. The Canada Centre also leads the Canadian government's engagement and cooperation with the Global Internet Forum to Counter Terrorism (GIFCT), established by Google, Facebook, Twitter, and Microsoft in 2017.

On 11 December 2018, the Canada Centre launched the "National Strategy on Countering Radicalization to Violence," which is meant to "explain[] radicalization to violence and the destructive and harmful behaviours involved," as well as outlining the federal government's "approach and key priorities in countering and preventing radicalization to violence." Implementation of the National Strategy is supervised by the National Expert Committee on Countering Radicalization to Violence.

The Community Resilience Fund (CRF) is a system, administered by the Canada Centre, for supporting "partnerships in countering radicalization to violence in Canada," providing funding to organizations towards engagement (e.g., research, cooperation, engaging communities, etc.) with the issue. As of 2019‑2020 onward, the Fund has been promised $7 million available each year for existing and new projects. Through CRF, the Canada Centre has supported the Centre for the Prevention of Radicalization Leading to Violence, located in Montréal, in conducting research on "better understanding risk and protective factors within families of individuals who radicalize to violence and also the role families and communities can play in mitigating radicalization to violence." Also through the Fund, the Canada Centre has supported "multi-agency intervention programs to build capacity to manage cases of individuals who are radicalizing to violence."

Counter-radicalization programs 
A number of government departments deliver "social programming that contribute[]" to supporting approaches "to preventing radicalization to violence;" such federal departments include:

 Royal Canadian Mounted Police — First Responders Terrorism Awareness Program
 Immigration, Refugees and Citizenship Canada — Settlement Program, and Resettlement Assistance Program
 Defence Research and Development Canada, Centre for Security Science — Canadian Safety and Security Program
 Global Affairs Canada — Anti-Crime Capacity Building Program, and the Counter-Terrorism Capacity Building Program
 Department of Justice Canada — Victims Fund
 Canadian Heritage — Community Support, Multiculturalism, and Anti-Racism Initiatives Program
 Status of Women Canada — Strategy to Prevent and Address Gender-Based Violence

Local government/non-profit initiatives funded by the Community Resilience Fund include:

 Furthering Our Communities by Uniting Services (FOCUS) Toronto — a program led by the Toronto Police Service, City of Toronto, and United Way Toronto and York Region, which is "building capacity to add radicalization to violence to the range of issues" that it addresses.
 Ottawa Multiagency Early Risk Intervention Tables (MERIT) — a collaborative intervention program supported by the Ottawa Police Service, local agencies, and service partners that is "building capacity to address cases of individuals radicalizing to violence," in addition to its existing capabilities.
 Edmonton Resiliency Project — a "collaborative approach" delivered by the Edmonton Police Service, City of Edmonton, and Organization for the Prevention of Violence "to prevention and intervention that draws on trusted community and organizational relationships to prevent violent extremism."
 Calgary Re-Direct — a partnership between the City of Calgary, Community and Neighbourhood Services, the Calgary Police Service, and others that "uses a multidisciplinary approach to intervention with youth and young adults who are vulnerable to radicalization to violence."
 Social Polarizations — a team of mental-health professionals who specialize in interventions to counter radicalization to violence, based in a local Integrated Health and Social Services Centre in Quebec.
 Centre for the Prevention of Radicalization Leading to Violence (CPRLV; often called the Montreal Centre)
 John Howard Society of Ottawa

List of international threats and attacks

List of domestic threats and attacks

Suspected terrorism 

 March 5, 2015 — While new anti-terrorism law was under consideration and months before federal election, four Conservative Party Members of Parliament (Denis Lebel, Steven Blaney, Christian Paradis and Maxime Bernier) in Quebec received letters with white powder (Anthrax hoaxes) and message "Conservateurs, vous serez anéantis," which translates to "Conservatives, you will be annihilated" at their constituency offices.

Terrorism abroad 
Canadian victims of non-Canada-related extremism abroad include:

 September 11, 2001 — 9/11 attacks (USA): United Airlines Flight 175 and American Airlines Flight 11 were purposefully crashed into the World Trade Center in New York City, killing thousands of people, including Garnet Bailey (53), a Canadian professional ice hockey player and scout who was a member of Stanley Cup and Memorial Cup winning teams.
August 19, 2003 — Canal Hotel bombing (Iraq): A suicide truck bombing in Baghdad supposedly carried out by Jama'at al-Tawhid wal-Jihad killed 22 people, including two Canadians—Christopher Klein-Beekman (31), a UNICEF representative, and Gillian Clark (47), an aid worker for the Christian Children's Fund (CCF).
September 2013 — Westgate shopping mall attack (Nairobi, Kenya): An attack carried out by Al-Shabaab killed 68 people, including two Canadians—a businessman and a Government of Canada official.
June 13, 2016 — Killing of Robert Hall (Philippines): On 21 September 2015, Canadian citizen Robert Hall (66) was kidnapped by Abu Sayyaf militants in the Philippines and beheaded nine months later near Patikul, Sulu.
January 15, 2006 — Killing of Glyn Berry (Afghanistan): A car bomb attack in Afghanistan killed Glyn Berry, the first Canadian diplomat to be killed while on duty in Afghanistan. Two other civilians were killed in the incident and 10 people were wounded, including three Canadian soldiers, MCpl. Paul Franklin, Pte. William Edward Salikin and Cpl. Jeffrey Bailey.

Extremists with Canadian connections abroad
The Combating Terrorism Act, which came into force in July 2013, was put in place with the intent to prevent and deter individuals from leaving Canada for particular terrorism-related purposes. In 2018, the Canadian government states that there has not been an increase, nor does it expect an increase, in the number of Canadian Extremist Travellers (CETs) who have returned to Canada. The total number of CETs identified by the government includes around 190 individuals who have a nexus to Canada, and near 60 who have returned.

The following are some extremists around the world with Canadian connections.

 Xristos Katsiroubas and Ali Medlej (Algeria) — two high school friends from London, Ontario who went to Morocco in 2011, and then onwards to Mauritania, Niger, and Libya, where they are said to have trained under Algerian terrorist Mokhtar Belmokhtar. Both were killed after taking part in a terrorist attack in the In Amenas hostage crisis in January 2013, which killed 38 hostages at an Algerian gas plant.
 Andre Poulin (Syria) — a man from Timmins, Ontario who subscribed to violent extremist views in 2008. Arriving in Syria in 2012, he is considered to have been killed fighting at the al-Minakh airfield in August 2013.
 Ali Mohamed Dirie (Syria) — a former member of the "Toronto 18" previously imprisoned for plotting terrorist attacks in Ontario. Within a year of his release, Dirie travelled to Syria and joined a terrorist group.
 Damian Clairmont or Mustafa al-Gharib (Syria) — a man Calgary, Alberta who subscribed to violent extremist views. He is presumed to have been killed in infighting between terrorist groups in Syria.
 Mahad Ali Dhore (Somalia) — a man who crossed into Somalia while visiting Kenya to join an al-Shabaab training camp. He is considered to have been killed while helping conduct an April 2013 terrorist attack in Mogadishu.

See also

 Integrated Terrorism Assessment Centre
 National Terrorism Threat Level
Charkaoui v Canada (Minister of Citizenship and Immigration)
 Anti-Canadian sentiment
 Anti-abortion violence in Canada
 Crime in Canada
 Law enforcement in Canada
 List of conflicts in Canada
 List of unsolved murders
 Terrorism in the United States
 List of attacks on legislatures

References

Further reading 
 Bell, Stewart. 2007. Cold Terror: How Canada Nurtures and Exports Terrorism around the World.
 Hamilton, Dwight. 2006. Inside Canadian Intelligence: Exposing the New Realities of Espionage and International Terrorism. Dundurn Press. . Preview at Google Books.
 Jiwa, Salim, and Donald J. Hauka. 2006. Margin of Terror: A Reporter's Twenty-Year Odyssey Covering the Tragedies of the Air India Bombing.
 Kellett, Anthony. 2004. "Terrorism in Canada, 1960-1992" Ch. 10 in Violence in Canada: Sociopolitical Perspectives.
 Roach, Kent. 2003. September 11: Consequences for Canada. McGill-Queen's University Press. ISBN 0-7735-2584-X. Preview at Google Books.
 Ross, J. I. 1988. "An Events Data Base on Political Terrorism in Canada: Some Conceptual and Methodological Problems." Conflict Quarterly 8(2):47–65.
 —— 1988. "Attributes of Domestic Political Terrorism in Canada, 1960-1985." Terrorism: An International Journal 11(3):213–33.
 —— 1992. "Attacking Terrorist Attacks: Initial Tests of the Contagion Between Domestic and International Terrorism in Canada." Low Intensity Violence and Law Enforcement 1(2):163–83.
 —— 1994. "Low-Intensity Conflict in the Peaceable Kingdom: The Attributes of International Terrorism in Canada, 1960-1990." Conflict Quarterly 14(3):36–62.
 —— 1995. "The Rise and Fall of Quebecois Separatist Terrorism: A Qualitative Application of Factors from two Models." Studies in Conflict & Terrorism 18(4):285–97.

External links

 The Anti-terrorism Act - Department of Justice
 Terrorism and Canada at The Canadian Encyclopedia, accessed September 6, 2019
 Canadian Incident Database — a publicly-accessible database describing terrorism and violent extremism incidents with a Canadian connection, between 1960 and early 2015.

Conflicts in Canada
Canada
 
Unsolved murders in Canada
Human rights abuses in Canada